Zbigniew Torzecki is a Polish sprint canoer who competed in the late 1970s and early 1980s. He won three medals in the K-4 10000 m at the ICF Canoe Sprint World Championships with two silvers (1978, 1979) and a bronze (1977).

References

Living people
Polish male canoeists
Year of birth missing (living people)
Place of birth missing (living people)
ICF Canoe Sprint World Championships medalists in kayak